The Professor's Cube (also known as the 5×5×5 Rubik's Cube and many other names, depending on manufacturer) is a 5×5×5 version of the original Rubik's Cube. It has qualities in common with both the 3×3×3 Rubik's Cube and the 4×4×4 Rubik's Revenge, and solution strategies for both can be applied.

History

The Professor's Cube was invented by Udo Krell in 1981. Out of the many designs that were proposed, Udo Krell's design was the first 5×5×5 design that was manufactured and sold. Uwe Mèffert manufactured the cube and sold it in Hong Kong in 1983.

Ideal Toys, who first popularized the original 3x3x3 Rubik's cube, marketed the puzzle in Germany as the "Rubik's Wahn" (German for illusion or delusion). When the cube was marketed in Japan, it was marketed under the name "Professor's Cube". Mèffert reissued the cube under the name "Professor's Cube" in the 1990s.

The early versions of the 5×5×5 cube sold at Barnes & Noble were marketed under the name "Professor's Cube" but currently, Barnes and Noble sells cubes that are simply called "5×5 Cube." Mefferts.com used to sell a limited edition version of the 5×5×5 cube called the Professor's Cube. This version had colored tiles rather than stickers. Verdes Innovations sells a version called the V-Cube 5.

Workings

The original Professor's Cube design by Udo Krell works by using an expanded 3×3×3 cube as a mantle with the center edge pieces and corners sticking out from the spherical center of identical mechanism to the 3×3×3 cube. All non-central pieces have extensions that fit into slots on the outer pieces of the 3×3×3, which keeps them from falling out of the cube while making a turn. The fixed centers have two sections (one visible, one hidden) which can turn independently. This feature is unique to the original design.

The Eastsheen version of the puzzle uses a different mechanism. The fixed centers hold the centers next to the central edges in place, which in turn hold the outer edges. The non-central edges hold the corners in place, and the internal sections of the corner pieces do not reach the center of the cube.

The V-Cube 5 mechanism, designed by Panagiotis Verdes, has elements in common with both. The corners reach to the center of the puzzle (like the original mechanism) and the center pieces hold the central edges in place (like the Eastsheen mechanism). The middle edges and center pieces adjacent to them make up the supporting frame and these have extensions which hold the rest of the pieces together. This allows smooth and fast rotation and creating arguably the fastest and most durable version of the puzzle at that time. Unlike the original 5×5×5 design, the V-Cube 5 mechanism was designed to allow speedcubing. Most current production 5×5×5 speed cubes have mechanisms based on Verdes' patent.

Stability and durability

The original Professor's Cube is inherently more delicate than the 3×3×3 Rubik's Cube because of the much greater number of moving parts and pieces. Because of its fragile design, the Rubik's brand Professor's Cube is not suitable for Speedcubing. Applying excessive force to the cube when twisting it may result in broken pieces.  Both the Eastsheen 5×5×5 and the V-Cube 5 are designed with different mechanisms in an attempt to remedy the fragility of the original design.

Permutations
There are 98 pieces on the exterior of the cube: 8 corners, 36 edges, and 54 centers (48 movable, 6 fixed).

Any permutation of the corners is possible, including odd permutations, giving 8! possible arrangements. Seven of the corners can be independently rotated, and the orientation of the eighth corner depends on the other seven, giving 37 (or 2,187) combinations.

There are 54 centers. Six of these (the center square of each face) are fixed in position. The rest consist of two sets of 24 centers. Within each set there are four centers of each color. Each set can be arranged in 24! different ways. Assuming that the four centers of each color in each set are indistinguishable, the number of permutations of each set is reduced to 24!/(246) arrangements, all of which are possible. The reducing factor comes about because there are 24 (4!) ways to arrange the four pieces of a given color. This is raised to the sixth power because there are six colors. The total number of permutations of all movable centers is the product of the permutations of the two sets, 24!2/(2412).

The 24 outer edges cannot be flipped due to the interior shape of those pieces. Corresponding outer edges are distinguishable, since the pieces are mirror images of each other. Any permutation of the outer edges is possible, including odd permutations, giving 24! arrangements. The 12 central edges can be flipped. Eleven can be flipped and arranged independently, giving 12!/2 × 211 or 12! × 210 possibilities (an odd permutation of the corners implies an odd permutation of the central edges, and vice versa, thus the division by 2). There are 24! × 12! × 210 possibilities for the inner and outer edges together.

This gives a total number of permutations of

The full number is precisely 282 870 942 277 741 856 536 180 333 107 150 328 293 127 731 985 672 134 721 536 000 000 000 000 000 possible permutations (about 283 duodecillion on the long scale or 283 trevigintillion on the short scale).

Some variations of the cube have one of the center pieces marked with a logo, which can be put into four different orientations. This increases the number of permutations by a factor of four to 1.13×1075, although any orientation of this piece could be regarded as correct. By comparison, the number of atoms in the observable universe is estimated at about 1080. Other variations increase the difficulty by making the orientation of all center pieces visible. An example of this is shown below.

Solutions

Speedcubers usually favor the Reduction method which groups the centers into one-colored blocks and grouping similar edge pieces into solid strips. This allows the cube to be quickly solved with the same methods one would use for a 3×3×3 cube, just a stretched out version. As illustrated to the right, the fixed centers, middle edges and corners can be treated as equivalent to a 3×3×3 cube. As a result, once reduction is complete the parity errors sometimes seen on the 4×4×4 cannot occur on the 5×5×5, or any cube with an odd number of edges for that matter.

Yau5 is another method speedcubers use. It is named after its proposer, Robert Yau. The method starts by solving the opposite centers (preferably white and yellow), then solving three cross edges (preferably white). Next, the remaining centers and last cross edge are solved. The last cross edge and the remaining unsolved edges are solved, and then it can be solved like a 3x3x3.

Another frequently used strategy is to solve the edges and corners of the cube first, and the centers last. This method is referred to as the Cage method, so called because the centers appear to be in a cage after the solving of edges and corners. The corners can be placed just as they are in any previous order of cube puzzle, and the centers are manipulated with an algorithm similar to the one used in the 4×4×4 cube.

A less frequently used strategy is to solve one side and one layer first, then the 2nd, 3rd and 4th layer, and finally the last side and layer. That is, like building a building. First the basement, then each floor, and finally the roof. This method is referred to as Layer-by-Layer. Similar to the beginner's method when you learn to solve the original Rubik's Cube, just with 2 added layers and a couple of centers. 

ABCube Method is a direct solve method originated by Sandra Workman in 2020. It is geared to complete beginners and non-cubers. It is similar in order of operation to the Cage Method, but differs functionally in that it is mostly visual and eliminates the standardized notation. It works on all complexity of cubes, from 2x2x2 through big cubes (nxnxn) and only utilizes two easy to remember algorithms; one four twists, the other eight twists, and it eliminates long parity algorithms.

World records
The world record for fastest 5×5×5 solve is 33.02 seconds, set by Max Park of the United States on 13 March 2022 in an official competition at Florida Big & Blind & Time 2022, in Orlando, Florida.  
 
The world record for fastest average of five solves (excluding fastest and slowest solves) is 38.42 seconds, also set by Max Park of the United States on 3 July 2022 in at BASC 34 - San Ramon 2022, in San Ramon, California, with the times of (41.15), 39.82, 38.46, 36.98 and (36.86). 

The record fastest time for solving a 5×5×5 cube blindfolded is 2 minutes, 21.62 seconds (including inspection), set by Stanley Chapel of the United States on 15 December 2019 at Michigan Cubing Club Epsilon 2019 in Ann Arbor, Michigan.

The record for mean of three solves solving a 5x5x5 cube blindfolded is 2 minutes, 27.63 seconds (including inspection), also set by Stanley Chapel of the United States on 15 December 2019 with the times of 2:32.48, 2:28.80 and 2:21.62

Top 5 solvers by single solve

Top 5 solvers by average of 5 solves

Top 5 solvers by single solve blindfolded

Top 5 solvers by average of 3 solves blindfolded

In popular culture

A Filipino TV series from ABS-CBN Entertainment named Little Big Shots shows a 10-year old cuber named Franco, who solved a 5×5×5 cube in 1 minute and 47.12 seconds.
In the movie Line Walker 2: Invisible Spy, two children are shown solving the 5×5×5 cube. They compete to solve multiple cubes consecutively, blindfolded, known as "5×5×5 multi-blind" by speedcubers.

See also
 Pocket Cube – A 2×2×2 version of the puzzle
 Rubik's Cube – The 3×3×3 original version of this puzzle
 Rubik's Revenge – A 4×4×4 version of the puzzle
 V-Cube 6 - A 6×6×6 version of the puzzle
 V-Cube 7 - A 7×7×7 version of the puzzle
 V-Cube 8 - An 8×8×8 version of the puzzle
 Combination puzzle

References

External links
 How to solve the 5x5 Rubik's Cube
 5x5 Rubik's Cube text solution
 5x5 Rubik's Cube interactive solution

Rubik's Cube
Novelty items
Single-player games
1980s toys